In q-analog theory, the Jackson integral series  in the theory of special functions that expresses the operation inverse to q-differentiation.

The Jackson integral was introduced by Frank Hilton Jackson.

Definition 
Let f(x) be a function of a real variable x. For a a real variable, the Jackson integral of f is defined by the following series expansion:

 

Consistent with this is the definition for 

   

More generally, if g(x) is another function and Dqg denotes its q-derivative, we can formally write

  or

 

giving a q-analogue of the Riemann–Stieltjes integral.

Jackson integral as q-antiderivative 
Just as the ordinary antiderivative of a continuous function can be represented by its Riemann integral, it is possible to show that the Jackson integral gives a unique q-antiderivative 
within a certain class of functions (see ).

Theorem 

Notes

References 
Victor Kac, Pokman Cheung, Quantum Calculus, Universitext, Springer-Verlag, 2002. 
Jackson F H (1904), "A generalization of the functions Γ(n) and xn", Proc. R. Soc. 74 64–72. 
Jackson F H (1910), "On q-definite integrals", Q. J. Pure Appl. Math. 41 193–203.

Special functions
Q-analogs